= Academic titles =

Academic titles may refer to:

- Academic degrees
- Academic ranks
- Titles of works in academic publishing
